is a Japanese breaststroke swimmer. In 2010, he won the 200 m event at the World Championships (short course) and at the Asian Games. At the 2014 Asian Games he was caught on surveillance cameras while stealing a video camera belonging to the Yonhap News Agency. He admitted to the fact and paid a fine of 1 million won (ca. US$1000). On October 7, 2014, he was banned for 18 months from competitions by Japan Swimming Federation and fired by his employer, sports apparel manufacturer Descente Ltd.

References

1989 births
Living people
People from Tōkai, Aichi
Japanese male breaststroke swimmers
Medalists at the FINA World Swimming Championships (25 m)
Asian Games medalists in swimming
Swimmers at the 2010 Asian Games
Swimmers at the 2014 Asian Games
Asian Games gold medalists for Japan
Medalists at the 2010 Asian Games
Universiade medalists in swimming
Universiade silver medalists for Japan
Medalists at the 2009 Summer Universiade
21st-century Japanese people